Authenticité may refer to:
 Authenticité (Chad)
 Authenticité (Zaire)
 Authenticity and Modernity Party (Parti Authenticité et Modernité)

See also
 Authenticity (disambiguation)